Salvage with a Smile is a 1940 British, black-and-white, sponsored war film, directed by Adrian Brunel and starring Ronald Shiner as the Dustman. It was produced by Ealing Studios and the Ministry of Supply for the Ministry of Information.

Synopsis
The educational film aims to help the "people back home" save paper, bones and metal, for the war effort.

Cast
 Aubrey Mallalieu as The Professor
 Kathleen Harrison as The Housekeeper
 Ronald Shiner as The Dustman
 Phyllis Morris as Miss Green

References

External links
 

1940 films
British black-and-white films
Films directed by Adrian Brunel
Ealing Studios films
British World War II propaganda films
Sponsored films
1940s English-language films